Steven Schick (born May or June 1954) is a percussionist and conductor from the United States, specializing in contemporary classical music. He teaches at the University of California, San Diego and is currently the Music Director and Conductor of the La Jolla Symphony Orchestra. Schick was born in Iowa and raised in a farming family. For the past 40 years, he has championed contemporary percussion music as a performer and teacher, by commissioning and premiering more than 150 new works for percussion.

Schick is Distinguished Professor of Music at UCSD and was previously a Consulting Artist in Percussion at the Manhattan School of Music. He was the percussionist of the Bang on a Can All-Stars of New York City from 1992 to 2002, and from 2000 to 2004 served as Artistic Director of the Centre International de Percussion de Genève in Geneva, Switzerland. Schick is founder and Artistic Director of the percussion group red fish blue fish, and in 2007 assumed the post of music director and conductor of the La Jolla Symphony and Chorus.

Schick's book on solo percussion music, The Percussionist's Art: Same Bed, Different Dreams, was published by the University of Rochester Press. His recording of The Mathematics of Resonant Bodies by John Luther Adams was released by Cantaloupe Music. A 3-CD set of the complete percussion music of Iannis Xenakis, made in collaboration with red fish blue fish, was issued by Mode Records.

In February 2011, Schick was named director of the San Francisco Contemporary Music Players. He replaces Maestro David Milnes who stepped down in 2009.

In 2012, he became the first Artist-in-Residence with the International Contemporary Ensemble (ICE).

References

General
The Percussionist's Art - Same Bed, Different Dreams (May 2006; University of Rochester Press)

External links
Info at UCSD
Info at Manhattan School of Music

Video: What creativity means

Living people
American male conductors (music)
University of California, San Diego faculty
American percussionists
1954 births
21st-century American conductors (music)
21st-century American male musicians